Lonappante Mammodisa is a 2019 Indian Malayalam-language comedy drama film written and directed by Leo Thaddeus. The film features Jayaram and Anna Rajan in lead roles. It was released on 1 February 2019.

Plot
Lonappan is a middle-aged man who leads a simple life with his three unmarried sisters. Even though he runs a watch repair shop along with his assistant Shameer, Lonappan has already lost interest in his job. After a series of events, Lonappan decides to pursue his childhood passion, storytelling.

Cast 

 Jayaram as Lonappan
 Shanthi Krishna as Valyechi
 Anna Rajan as Leena
 Eva Pavithran as Rosliy
 Joju George as Babu
Nisha Sarang as Cicily
 Hareesh Kanaran as Shameer
 Kaniha as Neelima
 Dileesh Pothen as Kunjuoottan
 Alencier Ley Lopez as Fr. Stephen Chacko
 Niyas Backer as Simon
 Vishak Nair as Sony
 Irshad as Vareed
 Anjali Nair as Annakkutty
 Sneha Sreekumar as Aleyamma
 Eric Zachariah as Young Lonappan
 Innocent as School Teacher (Guest Appearance)

Production
This is the fourth film directed by Leo Thaddeus.

Soundtrack
All songs were composed by Alphonse Joseph.

References

External links
 

2010s Malayalam-language films
2019 films
Indian comedy-drama films
Films set in the United Arab Emirates
Films scored by Alphons Joseph